The Lobito Herreño or Perro de Pastor Herreño is a Spanish breed or type of pastoral dog. It is found mostly on the island of El Hierro in the Canary Islands, but also on Gran Canaria, La Palma and Tenerife. The other two dogs in this group are the Podenco Orito Español and the Carea Castellano-Manchego.

The society published a draft breed standard for the Lobito Herreño in 2013.

History 

It is not clear whether or to what extent the modern dogs of the Canary Islands derive from dogs already present in the islands before the arrival of the Castilian conquistadores at the start of the fifteenth century. The origins of the Lobito Herreño are unknown; it is suggested that it derives from dogs brought to the archipelago in or after the eighteenth century.

In 2021 the Parliament of the Canary Islands passed a resolution declaring the principal indigenous animal breeds of the islands to be a "cultural, genetic and ethnographic heritage". The text of the resolution included the four internationally-recognised dog breeds of the islands – the Pastor Garafiano, the Perro Majorero, the Presa Canario and the Podenco Canario – but not the Lobito Herreño, although this had been discussed in Parliament.

The Lobito is not the only breed for which recognition is being sought in the Canaries; others are the Podenco Enano, also of El Hierro, and the Ratonero Palmero of La Palma.

Characteristics 

The Lobito Herreño is of wolf-like and primitive appearance. A study in 2009 of fifty-five animals on El Hierro found average heights and weights of / for bitches and / for dogs. The coat is usually grey but may also be reddish, both colours with pale masking round the mouth and eyes; solid white or cream is also permitted, these colours without masking. The tip of the tail is black.

Use 

Like other pastoral dogs, it was traditionally used to assist the shepherd with the movement and management of the flock, and was suspicious of strangers but faithful to its master. With the disappearance of the pastoral way of life, it is increasingly kept as a companion dog.

References 

Dog breeds originating in the Canary Islands
El Hierro